Ranitomeya benedicta, sometimes called the blessed poison frog, is a species of poison dart frogs found in the lowland rainforest of the Pampas del Sacramento in southern Loreto and eastern San Martín Region, northeastern Peru. Before 2008, the species was considered a subspecies of Ranitomeya fantastica. The IUCN considers the species vulnerable because of limited habitat range, habitat loss, and collection for the pet trade.

Morphology 
Ranitomeya benedicta is one of the larger species of thumbnail poison dart frogs. It has a red head and a large snout to vent length which helps distinguish it from other Ranitomeya such as the smaller red-backed poison frog. Males can reach approximately 16.5 mm in length from snout to vent, while the larger females can reach approximately 18.4 mm with some reaching 20.2 mm. Besides their red head they also possess black markings over their eyes which resembles a W shaped mask and have black colored limbs, dorsum, and venter with a blue reticulated pattern. In some populations, however, the reticulated pattern might not appear, instead showing some of the limbs or parts of the dorsum only being uniformly blue. While Ranitomeya fantastica might resemble this species, this species contains a head that's clearly red while R. fantastica head contains colors that are closer to a bright orange coloration.

References

Ranitomeya
Endemic fauna of Peru
Amphibians of Peru
Frogs of South America
Amphibians described in 2008